HMS Nubian was a  of the Royal Navy in service from 1962 and 1979. She was named after the Nubian ethnic group, located in Egypt and Sudan. She was sunk as a target in 1987.

Nubian was built by Portsmouth Dockyard, at a cost of £4,360,000. She was launched on 6 September 1960 by Lady Holland-Martin, wife of Vice-Admiral Sir Deric Holland-Martin, and commissioned on 9 October 1962.

Operational service
In 1964, Nubian suffered a collision that caused minor damage. She joined the Beira Patrol off Mozambique in 1967, supporting the enforcement of an oil blockade of Rhodesia. Nubian constituted the escort for the Daily Mail Trans-Atlantic Air Race in 1969 that commemorated the 50th Anniversary of Alcock and Brown's non-stop transatlantic flight from Newfoundland to Britain. In 1971 she was present at Portsmouth Navy Days. In 1975, Nubian reinforced the British garrison in Belize after Guatemala intensified its threats to annex the territory.

Nubian was present at the 1977 Spithead Fleet Review, held in honour of Queen Elizabeth II's Silver Jubilee. At this time she was part of the 5th Frigate Squadron.

In 1978, Nubian assisted in the cleanup after the supertanker Amoco Cadiz grounded off the coast of Brittany; more than 200,000 tons (180,000 metric tons) of oil had polluted the Brittany coastline.

Nubian entered the reserve in 1979, being placed in the Standby Squadron and put on the disposal list in 1981. While in reserve, Nubian became a training ship and had parts cannibalised for three sister-ships sold to Indonesia in 1984. The frigate was sunk as a target on 27 May 1987.

References

Publications
 
 
 
 

 

Tribal-class frigates
1960 ships
Ships built in Portsmouth